This is a list of township-level divisions of the province of Heilongjiang, People's Republic of China (PRC). After province, prefecture, and county-level divisions, township-level divisions constitute the formal fourth-level administrative divisions of the PRC. There are a total of 1,369 such divisions in Heilongjiang, divided into 393 subdistricts, 443 towns, 8 ethnic towns, 477 townships, and 48 ethnic townships. This list is divided first into the prefecture-level divisions then the county-level divisions.

Harbin

Acheng District
Subdistricts:
Tongcheng Subdistrict, Jindu Subdistrict, Jincheng Subdistrict, Hedong Subdistrict, Ashihe Subdistrict, Sheli Subdistrict, Xinli Subdistrict, Shuangfeng Subdistrict, Yuquan Subdistrict

Towns:
Feiketu, Jiaojie, Xiaoling, Pingshan, Yagou, Songfengshan, Hongxing, Jinlongshan

Townships:
Yangshu Township, Liaodian Manchu Ethnic Township

Daoli District
Subdistricts:
Anjing Subdistrict, Fushun Subdistrict, Xinhua Subdistrict, Kang'an Subdistrict, Shangzhi Subdistrict, Zhengyanghe Subdistrict, Jianguo Subdistrict, Anhe Subdistrict, Gongle Subdistrict, Stalin Subdistrict, Gongcheng Subdistrict, Jingwei Subdistrict, Zhaolin Subdistrict, Xinyang Road Subdistrict, Gongnong Subdistrict, Tongjiang Subdistrict, Chengxiang Road Subdistrict, Aijian Subdistrict

Towns:
Xinfa, Taiping, Xinnong, Yushu

The only township is Qunli Township

Daowai District
Subdistricts:
Jingyu Subdistrict, Taigu Subdistrict, Donglai Subdistrict, Binjiang Subdistrict, Renli Subdistrict, Nanshi Subdistrict, Chongjian Subdistrict, Zhenjiang Subdistrict, Dongyuan Subdistrict, Daxing Subdistrict, Shengli Subdistrict, Nanma Subdistrict, Minqiang Subdistrict, Dayoufang Subdistrict, Nanzhi Road Subdistrict, Huagong Subdistrict, Huochetou Subdistrict, Xinyi Subdistrict, Sankeshu Avenue Subdistrict, Shuini Road Subdistrict, Taiping Avenue Subdistrict, Lihua Subdistrict, Xinle Subdistrict

Towns:
Yongyuan, Juyuan, Tuanjie

The only township is Minzhu Township

Hulan District
Subdistricts:
Yaobao Subdistrict, Hulan Subdistrict, Limin Subdistrict, Lanhe Subdistrict, Kangjin Subdistrict, Shuangjing Subdistrict

Towns:
Fangtai, Shenjia, Erba, Shiren, Baikui, Lianhua, Dayong, Changling

Townships:
Yanglin Township, Xubao Township, Mengjia Township

Nangang District
Subdistricts:
Liaoyuan Subdistrict, Dacheng Subdistrict, Songhua River Subdistrict, Huayuan Subdistrict, Quxian Subdistrict, Tongda Subdistrict, Qizheng Subdistrict, Hexing Subdistrict, Haxi Subdistrict, Baojian Subdistrict, Rongshi Subdistrict, Fendou Subdistrict, Hujia Subdistrict, Gexin Subdistrict, Wenhua Subdistrict, Xianfeng Subdistrict, Xinchun Subdistrict, Yuejin Subdistrict

The only town is Wanggang, and the only township is Hongqi Manchu Ethnic Township

Pingfang District
Subdistricts:
Youxie Subdistrict, Baoguo Subdistrict, Lianmeng Subdistrict, Xinwei Subdistrict, Xinjiang Subdistrict, Xingjian Subdistrict

Towns:
Pingfang, Pingxin

Songbei District
Subdistricts:
Songbei Subdistrict, Songpu Subdistrict, Wanbao Subdistrict, Taiyangdao Subdistrict, Sandian Subdistrict, Song'an Subdistrict, Songxiang Subdistrict, Chuankou Subdistrict

Towns:
Leye, Duiqingshan

Xiangfang District
Subdistricts:
Xiangfang Avenue Subdistrict, Liushun Subdistrict, Hongqi Avenue Subdistrict, Anbeng Subdistrict, Tongtian Subdistrict, Xincheng Subdistrict, Tiedong Subdistrict, New Xiangfang Subdistrict, Wangzhao Subdistrict, Anle Subdistrict, Heping Road Subdistrict, Hexing Road Subdistrict, Daqing Road Subdistrict, Minsheng Road Subdistrict, Jiankang Road Subdistrict, Liming Subdistrict, Jinxiang Subdistrict, Tongxiang Subdistrict, Haping Road Subdistrict, Jianzhu Subdistrict, Wenzheng Subdistrict

Towns:
Chenggaozi, Chaoyang, Xingfu

The only township is Xiangyang Township

Shangzhi
Towns:
Shangzhi Town, Yabuli, Weihe, Yimianpo, Mao'ershan, Qingyang, Lianghe, Shitouhezi, Yuanbao, Heilonggong

Townships:
Zhenzhushan Township, Laojieji Township, Mayan Township, Changshou Township, Wujimi Township, Hedong Township, Yuchi Korean Ethnic Township

Shuangcheng
Towns:
Shuangcheng, Lanleng, Zhoujia, Wujia, Handian, Dancheng, Dongguan, Xingshan, Nongfeng Manchu and Xibe Ethnic Town

Townships:
Chaoyang Township, Jincheng Township, Yongsheng Township, Linjiang Township, Shuiquan Township, Wanlong Township, Qingling Manchu Ethnic Township, Lianxing Ethnic Township, Xingfu Manchu Ethnic Township, Xinxing Manchu Ethnic Township, Gongzheng Manchu Ethnic Township, Lequn Manchu Ethnic Township, Xile Manchu Ethnic Township, Tongxin Manchu Ethnic Township, Tuanjie Manchu Ethnic Township

Wuchang
Towns:
Wuchang, Shanhe, Xiaoshanzi, Dujia, Xiangyang, Chonghe, Beiyinhe, Anjia, Shahezi, Niujia Manchu Ethnic Town, Lalin Manchu Ethnic Town

Townships:
Xingsheng Township, Zhiguang Township, Weiguo Township, Changbao Township, Minyi Township, Longfengshan Township, Bajiazi Township, Changshan Township, Xinglong Township, Erhe Township, Hongqi Manchu Ethnic Township, Yingchengzi Manchu Ethnic Township, Minle Korean Ethnic Ethnic Township

Bayan County
Towns:
Bayan Town, Xinglong, Xiji, Waxing, Longquan, Bayangang, Longmiao, Wanfa, Tianzeng, Heishan

Townships:
Songhuajiang Township, Fujiang Township, Huashan Township, Fengle Township, Dexiang Township, Hongguang Township, Shanhou Township, Zhendong Township

Bin County
Towns:
Binzhou, Juren, Binxi, Tangfang, Bin'an, Xindian, Shengli, Ningyuan, Baidu, Pingfang, Manjing, Chang'an

Townships:
Yonghe Township, Niaohe Township, Minhe Township, Jingjian Township, Sanbao Township

Fangzheng County
Towns:
Fangzheng, Daluomi, Huifa

Townships:
Baoxing Township, Deshan Township, Tianmen Township, Yihantong Township, Songnan Township

Mulan County
Towns:
Mulan, Dongxing, Dagui, Lidong, Liuhe, Xinmin

Townships:
Jianguo Township, Jixing Township

Tonghe County
Towns:
Tonghe, Wuyapao, Qinghe, Nonghe, Fengshan, Xiangshun

Townships:
Sanzhan Township, Fulin Township

Yanshou County
Towns:
Yanshou, Jiaxin, Zhonghe, Liutuan, Yanhe

Townships:
Yuhe Township, Shoushan Township, Anshan Township, Qingchuan Township

Yilan County
Towns:
Yilan, Dalianhe, Daotaiqiao, Hongkeli, Sandaogang, Jiangwan

Townships:
Yinglan Korean Ethnic Township

Daqing

Datong District
Subdistricts:
Qingpu Subdistrict, Linyuanzhen Subdistrict, Lizhi Subdistrict, Xinhua Subdistrict, Datongzhen Subdistrict, Gaotaizizhen Subdistrict

Towns:
Datong, Gaotaizi, Taiyangsheng, Linyuan

Townships:
Bajingzi Township, Zhusan Township, Laoshantou Township, Shuangyushu Township

Honggang District
Subdistricts:
Honggang Subdistrict, Jiefang Subdistrict, Babaishang Subdistrict, Chuangye Subdistrict, Xingnan Subdistrict

The only township is Xingshugang Township

Longfeng District
Subdistricts:
Longfeng Subdistrict, Ziqiang Subdistrict, Dongguang Subdistrict, Xinghua Subdistrict, Wolitun Subdistrict

The only township is Longfeng Township

Ranghulu District
Subdistricts:
Xibin Subdistrict, Fendou Subdistrict, Xiufeng Subdistrict, Longgang Subdistrict, Qingxin Subdistrict, Yinlang Subdistrict

The only town is Lamadian

Sartu District
Subdistricts:
Sartu Subdistrict, Huizhan Subdistrict, Tieren Subdistrict, Youyi Subdistrict, Yongjun Subdistrict, Huoju Subdistrict, Fuqiang Subdistrict, Dong'an Subdistrict, Dongfeng Subdistrict

Dorbod Mongol Autonomous County
Towns:
Taikang, Yantongtun, Hujitumo, Talaha

Townships: 
Jiangwan Township, Yixin Township, Ke'ertai Township, Bayinnuolin Township, Yaoxin Township, Bayanchagan Township, Aolinxibai Township

Lindian County
Towns:
Lindian, Hongqi, Heminghu

Townships:
Dongxing Township, Hongwei Township, Huayuan Township, Sihe Township, Liming Township

Zhaoyuan County
Towns:
Zhaoyuan, Xinzhan, Maoxing, Erzhan, Sanzhan, Toutai, Gulong

Townships:
Minyi Township, Guqia Township, Daxing Township, Fuxing Township, Heping Township, Bohetai Township, Haode Mongol Ethnic Township, Yishun Mongol Ethnic Township, Chaodeng Mongol Ethnic Township

Zhaozhou County
Towns:
Zhaozhou, Xingcheng, Chaoyanggou, Fengle, Yongle, Erjingzi

Townships:
Tuogu Township, Chaoyang Township, Xinfu Township, Shuanglong Township, Yongsheng Township, Yushu Township

Miscellanea:
Leyuan Pedigree Ranch, Weixing Breeding Ranch

Da Hinggan Ling Prefecture

Huzhong District
Towns:
Huzhong Town, Bishui, Huyuan, Hongwei

Jiagedaqi District
Subdistricts:
Dongshan Subdistrict, Weidong Subdistrict, Hongqi Subdistrict, Changhong Subdistrict, Shuguang Subdistrict, Guangming Subdistrict

Townships:
Jiabei Township, Baihua Township

Songling District
Towns:
Xiaoyangqi, Jingsong, Guyuan

Xinlin District
Towns:
Xinlin Town, Cuigang, Tayuan, Dawusu, Ta'ergen, Bizhou, Hongtu

Huma County
Towns:
Huma, Hanjiayuan

Townships:
Sanka Township, Jinshan Township, Xinghua Township, Oupu Township, Beijiang Township, Baiyinna Oroqen Ethnic Township

Mohe County
Towns:
Silinji, Tuqiang, Jingshou, Xing'an

The only township is Beiji Township

Tahe County
Towns:
Tahe, Walagan, Pangu

Townships:
Yixiken Township, Kaikukang Township, Shibazhan Oroqen Ethnic Township

Hegang

Dongshan District
Subdistricts:
Xinyi Subdistrict, Sanjie Subdistrict, Gongrencun Subdistrict, Dongshan Subdistrict

The only town is Xinhua

Townships:
Tuanjie Township, Dongfanghong Township, Hongqi Township, Shuyuan Township

Gongnong District
Subdistricts:
Hubin Subdistrict, Tuanjie Subdistrict, Jiefang Subdistrict, Yucai Subdistrict, Xinnan Subdistrict, Hongqi Subdistrict

Nanshan District
Subdistricts:
Dalu Subdistrict, Tiedong Subdistrict, Tiexi Subdistrict, Liuhao Subdistrict, Fuli Subdistrict, Lulinshan Subdistrict

Xiangyang District, Hegang
Subdistricts:
Beishan Subdistrict, Hongjun Subdistrict, Guangming Subdistrict, Shengli Subdistrict, Nanyi Subdistrict

Xing'an District
Subdistricts:
Junde Road Subdistrict, Hedong Road Subdistrict, Xingchang Road Subdistrict, Xing'an Road Subdistrict, Xingjian Road Subdistrict

Xingshan District
Subdistricts:
Gounan Subdistrict, Goubei Subdistrict, Lingnan Subdistrict, Lingbei Subdistrict

Luobei County
Towns:
Fengxiang, Hebei, Mingshan, Zhaoxing, Tuanjie

Townships:
Taipinggou Township, Huanshan Township, Fendou Township, Lianhua Township, Weichang Township, Dongming Korean Ethnic Township

Suibin County
Towns:
Suibin, Zhongren, Suidong

Townships:
Fuqiang Township, Beishan Township, Xinfu Township, Beigang Township, Liansheng Township, Fuxing Township

Heihe

Aihui District
Subdistricts:
Huayuan Subdistrict, Xing'an Subdistrict, Xixing Subdistrict, Hailan Subdistrict

Towns:
Xigangzi, Aihui Town, Handaqi

Townships:
Xingfu Township, Sijiazi Manchu Ethnic Township, Kunhe Daur and Manchu Ethnic Township, Shangmachang Township, Zhangdiyingzi Township, Xifengshan Township, Xinsheng Oroqen Ethnic Township, Erzhan Township

Bei'an
Subdistricts:
Heping Subdistrict, Zhaolin Subdistrict, Qinghua Subdistrict, Tiexi Subdistrict, Tienan Subdistrict, Beigang Subdistrict

Towns:
Tongbei, Zhaoguang, Shiquan, Haixing, Erjing

Townships:
Chengjiao Township, Dongsheng Township, Zhuxing Township, Yangjia Township

Wudalianchi
Subdistricts:
Qingshan Subdistrict

Towns:
Long, Heping, Shuangquan, Wudalianchi Town

Townships:
Xinfa Township, Xinglong Township, Xing'an Township, Chaoyang Township, Tuanjie Township, Jianshe Township, Taiping Township

Nenjiang County
Towns:
Nenjiang, Shuangshan, Yilaha, Haijiang, Duobaoshan, Qianjin, Changfu

Townships:
Baiyun Township, Keluo Township, Maihai Township, Taxi Township, Huolongmen Township, Lianxing Township, Linjiang Township, Changjiang Township

Sunwu County
The only subdistrict is Sunwuchengqu Subdistrict

Towns:
Sunwu, Chenqing, Siji

Townships:
Xixing Township, Yanjiang Manchu Township, Yaotun Township, Woniuhe Township, Qunshan Township, Fendou Township, Hongqi Township, Zhengyangshan Township, Qingxi Township

Xunke County
Towns:
Qike, Xunhe

Townships:
Ayanhe Township, Kelin Township, Baoshan Township, Songshugou Township, Chelu Township, Bianjiang Township, Ganchazi Township, Dapingtai Township, Xinxing Oroqen Ethnic Township, Xin'e Oroqen Ethnic Township

Jiamusi

Dongfeng District
Subdistricts:
Jianguo Subdistrict, Xiaoyun Subdistrict, Jiadong Subdistrict, Jianan Subdistrict, Zaozhi Subdistrict

Townships:
Songjiang Township, Jianguo Township

Jiaoqu
Subdistricts:
Jiaxi Subdistrict, Youyi Road Subdistrict

Towns:
Lianjiangkou, Changfa, Wangjiang, Aoqi, Dalai

Townships:
Ping'an Township, Gaofeng Township, Qunsheng Township, Xigemu Township, Yanjiang Township, Sifeng Township, Changqing Township

Qianjin District
Subdistricts:
Fendou Subdistrict, Yong'an Subdistrict, Zhanqian Subdistrict, Nangang Subdistrict, Liangzihe Subdistrict, Tianyuan Subdistrict

Xiangyang District, Jiamusi
Subdistricts:
Baowei Subdistrict, West Nangang Subdistrict, Qiaonan Subdistrict, Xilin Subdistrict, Jianshe Subdistrict, Chang'an Subdistrict

Fujin City
Subdistricts:
Chengdong Subdistrict, Chengxi Subdistrict

Towns:
Fujin Town, Erlongshan, Xiangyangchuan, Jinshan, Toulin, Xinglonggang, Hongsheng, Shangjieji, Yanshan, Chang'an, Dayushu

Tongjiang
Towns:
Tongjiang, Leye, Sancun, Linjiang

Townships:
Xiangyang Township, Qinghe Township, Jinchuan Township, Yinchuan Township, Jiejinkou Township, Bacha Township

Fuyuan County
Towns:
Fuyuan, Nongqiao, Zhuaji, Hanconggou

Townships:
Bielahong Township, Haiqing Township, Yanan Township, Nongjiang Township, Tongjiang Township

Huachuan County
Towns:
Yuelai, Sujiadian, Xincheng, Hengtoushan

Townships:
Donghe Township, Lifeng Township, Chuangye Township, Simajia Township, Xinghuo Township

Huanan County
Towns:
Huanan, Mengjiagang, Yanjia, Tulongshan, Tuoyaozi, Shitouhezi

Townships:
Lishu Township, Jinsha Township, Mingyi Township, Dabalang Township

Tangyuan County
Towns:
Tangyuan, Zhulian, Xianglan, Heli, Tangwang

Townships:
Taipingchuan Township, Yongfa Township, Jixiang Township, Shengli Township, Zhenxing Township

Jixi

Chengzihe District
Subdistricts:
Chengzihe Subdistrict, Chengxi Subdistrict, Zhengyang Subdistrict, Xinghua Subdistrict, Donghai Subdistrict

Townships:
Changqing Township, Yongfeng Korean Ethnic Township

Didao District
Subdistricts:
Dongxing Subdistrict, Kuangli Subdistrict, Ximei Subdistrict, Datonggou Subdistrict

Townships:
Didaohe Township, Lanling Township

Hengshan District
Subdistricts:
Huamulin Subdistrict, Greater Hengshan Subdistrict, Lesser Hengshan Subdistrict, Erdaohezi Subdistrict, Zhangxin Subdistrict, Fendou Subdistrict, Liumao Subdistrict

Townships:
Hongqi Township, Minzhu Township, Liumao Township

Jiguan District
Subdistricts:
Xiangyang Subdistrict, Nanshan Subdistrict, Lixin Subdistrict, Dongfeng Subdistrict, Red Army Road Subdistrict, West Jixi Subdistrict, Xishan Subdistrict

Townships:
Hongxing Township, Xijiao Township

Lishu District
Subdistricts:
Shilin Subdistrict, Jianchang Subdistrict, Pinggang Subdistrict, Maoling Subdistrict, Jieli Subdistrict

Mashan District
The only subdistrict Mashan Subdistrict

Hulin
Towns:
Hulin Town, Dongfanghong, Yingchun, Hutou, Yanggang, Zhongcheng, Baodong

Townships:
Xiaomuhe Township, Abei Township, Weiguang Township, Xinle Township

Mishan
The only subdistrict is Zhongxin Subdistrict

Towns:
Mishan Town, Lianzhushan, Zhiyi, Peide, Heitai, Dangbi, Xingkai

Townships:
Errenban Township, Baipaozi Township, Xingkaihu Township, Chengzihe Township, Yangmu Township, Liumao Township, Fuyuan Township, Taiping Township, Baiyuwan Township, Heping Township

Jidong County
Towns:
Jidong, Pingyang, Xiangyang, Hada, Yong'an, Yonghe, Donghai, Xingnong

Townships:
Jilin Township, Mingde Korean Ethnic Township, Xialiangzi Township

Mudanjiang

Aimin District
Subdistricts:
Xiangyang Subdistrict, Huanghua Subdistrict, Tiebei Subdistrict, Xinhua Subdistrict, Daqing Subdistrict, Xingping Subdistrict, Beishan Subdistrict

The only township is Bei'an Township

Dong'an District
Subdistricts:
Qixing Subdistrict, Xin'an Subdistrict, Chang'an Subdistrict, Wuxing Subdistrict, Xinglong Subdistrict

Xi'an District
Subdistricts:
Xianfeng Subdistrict, Huoju Subdistrict, Lixin Subdistrict, Mudan Subdistrict, Jiangbin Subdistrict, Yanjiang Subdistrict

The only town is Wenchun, and the only township is Hainan Korean Ethnic Township

Yangming District
Subdistricts:
Yangming Subdistrict, Qianjin Subdistrict, Xinxing Subdistrict, Hualinxiangjiaochang Subdistrict

Towns:
Tieling, Hualin, Modaoshi, Wulin

Hailin
Towns:
Hailin Town, Changting, Chaihe, Hengdaohe, Shanshi, Erdaohe, Sandaohezi, Xin'an Korean Ethnic Town

Muling
Towns:
Bamiantong, Muling Town, Xingyuan, Maqiaohe, Xiachengzi

Townships:
Gonghe Township, Fulu Township, Hexi Township,

Others:
Bamiantong Forestry Unit, Muling Forestry Unit

Ning'an
Towns:
Ning'an Town, Dongjingcheng, Bohai, Hailang, Shalan, Langang, Shiyan

Townships:
Jiangnan Township, Sanling Township, Wolong Township, Mahe Township, Jingbo Township

Suifenhe
Towns:
Suifenhe Town, Funing

Dongning County
Towns:
Dongning, Suiyang, Laoheishan, Daduchuan, Daohe, Sanchakou Korean Ethnic Town

Townships:
Gonghe Township, Jinchang Township, Huangnihe Township, Nantianmen Township

Linkou County
Towns:
Linkou, Gucheng, Zhujia, Diaoling, Longzhao, Lianhua, Liushu, Sandaotong

Townships:
Kuishan Township, Qingshan Township, Jiantang Township

Qiqihar

Ang'angxi District
Subdistricts:
Xinxing Subdistrict, Xinjian Subdistrict, Daobei Subdistrict, Linji Subdistrict

Towns:
Yushutun, Shuishiying Manchu Ethnic Town

Fularji District
Subdistricts:
Hong'an Subdistrict, Yanjiang Subdistrict, Tiebei Subdistrict, Beixing Subdistrict, Heping Subdistrict, Dianli Subdistrict, Xingfu Subdistrict, Hongbaoshi Subdistrict

Townships:
Changqing Township, Du'ermenqin Daur Ethnic Township

Jianhua District
Subdistricts:
Gongjian Road Subdistrict, West Zhonghua Road Subdistrict, Zhonghua Road Subdistrict, Chongjian Road Subdistrict, Jianshe Road Subdistrict, Bukui Avenue Subdistrict, North Bukui Avenue Subdistrict, South Bukui Avenue Subdistrict, Wenhua Avenue Subdistrict, Xinming Avenue Subdistrict, Huxi Road Subdistrict

Longsha District
Subdistricts:
Wulong Subdistrict, Zhengyang Subdistrict, Jiang'an Subdistrict, Hubin Subdistrict, Caihong Subdistrict, Nanhang Subdistrict

Meilisi Daur District
The only subdistrict is Meilisi Subdistrict

Towns:
Ya'ersai, Dahudian, Gonghe, Woniutu Daur Ethnic Town

Townships:
Meilisi Township, Manggetu Daur Ethnic Township

Nianzishan District
Subdistricts:
Fanrong Subdistrict, Fuqiang Subdistrict, Yuejin Subdistrict, Dong'an Subdistrict

The only township is Shuguang Township

Tiefeng District
Subdistricts:
Longhua Subdistrict, Xingongdi Subdistrict, Zhanqian Subdistrict, Nanpu Subdistrict, Donghu Subdistrict, Shuguang Subdistrict, Tongdong Subdistrict, Guangrong Subdistrict, Beijuzhai Subdistrict

The only township is Zhalong Township

Nehe City
Subdistricts:
Tongjiang Subdistrict, Yuting Subdistrict

Towns:
Laha, Longhe, Nenan, Tongnan, Laolai, Erkeqian, Xuetian, Changfa, Tongyi, Jiujing, Liuhe

Townships:
Kongguo Township, Hesheng Township, Tongxin Township, Xingwang Evenk Ethnic Township

Baiquan County
Towns:
Baiquan, Sandao, Xingnong, Changchun, Longquan, Guofu, Fuqiang

Townships:
Xinsheng Township, Xingguo Township, Shangsheng Township, Xinghua Township, Dazhong Township, Fengchan Township, Yongqin Township, Ziqiang Township, Ainong Township

Fuyu County
Towns:
Fuyu, Fulu, Fuhai, Erdaowan, Long'anqiao

Townships:
Taha Manchu and Daur Ethnic Township, Fanrong Township, Youyi Daur, Manchu, and Kirghiz Ethnic Township, Shaowen Township, Zhonghou Township

Gannan County
Towns:
Gannan, Dongyang, Pingyang

Townships:
Weijian Township, Changshan Township, Zhongxing Township, Yinhe Township, Changjigang Township, Xinglong Township, Jubao Township, Chahayang Township, Baoshan Township

Kedong County
Towns:
Kedong, Baoquan, Qianfeng, Yugang

Townships:
Changsheng Township, Runjin Township, Jincheng Township

Keshan County
Towns:
Keshan, Beixing, Xicheng, Gucheng, Beilian, Xihe

Townships:
Henan Township, Shuanghe Township, Hebei Township, Gubei Township, Xilian Township, Fazhan Township, Xijian Township, Xianghua Township, Shuguang Township

Longjiang County
Towns:
Longjiang, Jingxing, Longxing, Shanquan, Qikeshu

Townships:
Duibao Township, Yaluhe Township, Yongfa Township, Jiqinhe Township, Touzhan Township, Xiangshan Township, Donghua Township, Baishan Township, Heshan Township, Heigang Township, Luhe Township, Huamin Township, Fada Township

Tailai County
Towns:
Tailai, Tazicheng, Pingyang, Daxing, Tangchi, Jiangqiao Mongol Ethnic Town, Heping, Keli

Townships:
Ningjiang Mongol Ethnic Township, Shengli Mongol Ethnic Township

Yi'an County
Towns:
Yi'an, Yilong, Shuangyang, Sanxing, Zhongxin

Townships:
Furao Township, Jiefang Township, Yangchun Township, Xinfa Township, Taidong Township, Shangyou Township, Hongxing Township, Xianfeng Township, Xintun Township, Xiangqian Township, Xinxing Township, Qingfeng Township, Xiangyang Township

Qitaihe

Qiezihe District
Subdistricts:
Xinfu Subdistrict, Dongfeng Subdistrict, Fuqiang Subdistrict, Xiangyang Subdistrict, Longhu Subdistrict

Towns:
Qiezihe Town, Hongwei

Townships:
Tieshan Township, Zhongxinhe Township

Taoshan District
Subdistricts:
Taoxi Subdistrict, Taodong Subdistrict, Taonan Subdistrict, Taobei Subdistrict, Taoshan Subdistrict, Xinggang Subdistrict

Towns:
Wanbaohe

Xinxing District
Subdistricts:
Xinghua Subdistrict, Xincheng Subdistrict, Xinjian Subdistrict, Beishan Subdistrict, Xinli Subdistrict, Henan Subdistrict, Gangyaogou Subdistrict, Xinhe Subdistrict, Yuexiu Subdistrict, Xin'an Subdistrict

The only town is Hongqi, and the only township is Changxing Township

Boli County
Subdistricts:
Xinqi Subdistrict, Xinhua Subdistrict, Yuanming Subdistrict, Tiexi Subdistrict, Chengxi Subdistrict

Towns:
Boli, Woken, Shuanghe, Xiaowuzhan, Dasizhan

Townships:
Qingshan Township, Yongheng Township, Qiangken Township, Xingshu Korean Ethnic Township, Jixing Korean and Manchu Ethnic Township

Shuangyashan

Baoshan District
Subdistricts:
Hongqi Subdistrict, Yuejin Subdistrict, Qixing Subdistrict, Shuangyang Subdistrict, Xin'an Subdistrict, East Baowei Subdistrict, Dianchang Subdistrict

The only town is Qixing

Jianshan District
Subdistricts:
Bama Road Subdistrict, Erma Road Subdistrict, Zhongxin Station Subdistrict, Fu'an Subdistrict, Yaodi Subdistrict, Tiexi Subdistrict

The only township is Anbang Township

Lingdong District
Subdistricts:
Zhongxin Subdistrict, Beishan Subdistrict, Nanshan Subdistrict, Dongshan Subdistrict, Xishan Subdistrict, Zhongshan Subdistrict

The only township is Changsheng Township

Sifangtai District
Subdistricts:
Central Zhenxing Road Subdistrict, East Zhenxing Road Subdistrict, Jixian Subdistrict, Dongrong Subdistrict

The only town is Taibao

Baoqing County
Towns:
Baoqing Town, Qixingpao, Qingyuan, Longtou, Xiaochengzi, Jiaxinzi

Townships:
Chaoyang Township, Qixinghe Township, Wanjinshan Township, Jiashanzi Township

Jixian County
Towns:
Fuli, Jixian, Fengle, Shengchang, Taiping

Townships:
Yong'an Township, Yaotun Township, Lianming Township, Shagang Township, Liming Township, Shanqu Township, Xing'an Township

Raohe County
Towns:
Raohe, Xiaojiahe, Xifeng, Wulindong

Townships:
Yongle Township, Datonghe Township, Xilinzi Township, Dajiahe Township, Shanli Township, Luyuan Township, Sipai Nani Ethnic Township

Youyi County
Towns:
Youyi, Xinglong, Fenggang, Longshan

Townships:
Xingsheng Township, Dongjian Township, Qingfeng Township, Youlin Township, Xinzhen Township, Jianshe Township, Chengfu Korean and Manchu Ethnic Township

Suihua

Beilin District
Subdistricts:
Zilai Subdistrict, Ailu Subdistrict, Dayou Subdistrict, Jitai Subdistrict, Dongxing Subdistrict, Beilin Subdistrict

Towns:
Baoshan, Suisheng, Xichangfa, Yong'an, Taipingchuan, Qinjia, Shuanghe, Sanhe, Sifangtai, Jinhe, Zhangwei, Dongjin

Townships:
Hongqi Manchu Ethnic Township, Liangang Township, Xinhua Township, Xingfu Township, Dongfu Township, Sanjing Township, Wuying Township, Xinghe Korean Ethnic Township

Anda
Subdistricts:
Xinxing Subdistrict, Tiexi Subdistrict, Anhong Subdistrict

Towns:
Anda, Jixinggang, Renmin, Laohugang, Zhongben, Taipingzhuang, Wanbaoshan, Yangcao, Changde, Shengping

Townships:
Qingkenpao Township, Huoshishan Township, Wolitun Township, Xianyuan Township

Hailun
Towns:
Hailun Town, Dongfeng, Xiangfu, Haixing, Lunhe, Gonghe, Haibei

Townships:
Qianjin Township, Xiangrong Township, Changfa Township, Donglin Township, Hainan Township, Leye Township, Gongrong Township, Fumin Township, Fengshan Township, Yongfu Township, Baixiang Township, Lianfa Township, Yonghe Township, Aimin Township, Zhayinhe Township, Shuanglu Township

Zhaodong
Subdistricts:
Xiyuan District, Chaoyang District, Zhengyang District, Dongsheng District

Towns:
Zhaodong Town, Sizhan, Wuzhan, Songzhan, Changwu, Shangjia, Laozhou, Limudian, Jiangjia, Wuliming, Liming

Townships:
Haicheng Township, Xuanhua Township, Anmin Township, Mingjiu Township, Honghe Township, Yuejin Township, Xiangyang Township, Taiping Township, Dechang Township, Xibali Township

Lanxi County
Towns:
Lanxi, Yulin, Linjiang, Pingshan

Townships:
Lanjiao Township, Kangrong Township, Lanhe Township, Changjiang Township, Changgang Township, Hongguang Township, Bei'an Township, Fendou Township, Hongxing Township, Shengli Township, Yuanda Township, Yixin Township, Liaoyuan Township, Xinghuo Township

Mingshui County
Towns:
Mingshui, Tongda, Xingren, Yongtou, Chongde, You'ai

Townships:
Tuanjie Township, Shuangxing Township, Dongxing Township, Yongjiu Township, Shuren Township, Guangrong Township, Fanrong Township, Tongquan Township, Yulin Township

Qing'an County
Towns:
Qing'an, Daluo, Ping'an, Jiusheng, Lelao, Minle

Townships:
Xinmin Township, Jianmin Township, Jubaoshan Township, Fengshou Township, Xinsheng Township, Liangli Township, Fengtian Township, Fazhan Township, Tongle Township, Zhifu Township, Yuanbao Township, Shuangsheng Township

Qinggang County
Towns:
Qinggang, Zhonghe, Luhe, Xinghua, Yongfeng, Huoxiang

Townships:
Changsheng Township, Zhagang Township, Minzheng Township, Desheng Township, Laodong Township, Yingchun Township, Lianfeng Township, Xincun Township, Jianshe Township

Suileng County
Towns:
Suileng, Shangji, Sihaidian, Shuangchahe

Townships:
Kaoshan Township, Houtou Township, Ni'erhe Township, Changshan Township, Geshan Township, Suizhong Township, Keyinhe Township

Wangkui County
Towns:
Wangkui, Lianhua, Tongjiang, Weixing, Haifeng, Huiqi

Townships:
Huojian Township, Dongjiao Township, Dengta Township, Dongsheng Township, Gongliu Township, Lingshan Township, Housan Township, Furao Township, Xianfeng Township, Fuyuan Township, Huancheng Township, Minsan Township, Xiangbai Manchu Ethnic Township

Yichun

Cuiluan District
Subdistricts:
Xiangyang Subdistrict, Shuguang Subdistrict

Dailing District
The only subdistrict is Dailing Subdistrict.

Hongxing District
The only subdistrict is Hongxing Subdistrict.

Jinshantun District
Subdistricts:
Fendou Subdistrict, Jinshan Subdistrict

Meixi District
The only subdistrict is Meixi Subdistrict

Nancha District
Subdistricts:
Dongsheng Subdistrict, Lianhe Subdistrict, Xishui Subdistrict

Towns:
Chenming, Haolianghe

The only township is Yingchun Township

Shangganling District
The only subdistrict is Hongshan Subdistrict

Tangwanghe District
Subdistricts:
Henan Subdistrict, Henan Subdistrict

Wumahe District
The only subdistrict is Wumahe Subdistrict

Wuyiling District
The only subdistrict is Wuyiling Subdistrict

Wuying District
Subdistricts:
Wuying Subdistrict, Wuxing Subdistrict

Xilin District
Subdistricts:
Xilin Subdistrict, Xinxing Subdistrict, Taiqing Subdistrict

Xinqing District
Subdistricts:
Xinqing Subdistrict, Xing'an Subdistrict

Yichun District
Subdistricts:
Qianjin Subdistrict, Hongsheng Subdistrict, Xuri Subdistrict, Chaoyang Subdistrict, Dongsheng Subdistrict

Youhao District
Subdistricts:
Youhao Subdistrict, Shuangzihe Subdistrict, Tielin Subdistrict

Tieli
Towns:
Tieli Town, Shuangfeng, Taoshan, Langxiang

Townships:
Wangyang Township, Gongnong Township, Nianfeng Township

Jiayin County
Towns:
Chaoyang, Wuyun, Wulaga

Townships:
Changsheng Township, Xiangyang Township, Hujia Township, Hongguang Township, Baoxing Township, Qingshan Township

References

 
Heilongjiang
Townships